Sir Cornthwaite Hector William James Rason (18 June 1858 – 15 March 1927), better known as Hector Rason, was the seventh Premier of Western Australia.

Early life
Rason was born in Cleeve, Somerset, in England on 18 June 1858.  He was the son of Cornthwaite Hector Rason (Snr), a Royal Navy surgeon who was the medical officer at York, Western Australia, in 1866 and 1867.  Rason (Jnr) was educated at private schools in Eastbourne, Brighton and Reading, and worked as a railway clerk.

Business career
In October 1880, Rason emigrated to Perth, Australia, but returned to England after eighteen months.  In February 1883, he married Mary E. Terry, and shortly afterwards returned to Western Australia with his wife and her brother, W. R. Terry.  Rason and Terry set up business as storekeepers at Toodyay and Guildford, but after a few years Terry returned to England.  Rason then went into partnership with a Mr Webster, and attempted to benefit from the gold rushes in the Kimberley and Goldfields regions.  Rason also spent some time in Coolgardie trading as a mining engineer and auctioneer.  He retired from business in 1891, but was affected by the firm's bankruptcy in 1892.  From 1893 to 1895 he was a mining agent and auctioneer in Coolgardie, and in 1896 he moved to Mount Magnet.  From 1897 to 1898, Rason was Mayor of the Municipality of Guildford.

Politics
In January 1889, Rason was elected to the Western Australian Legislative Council for the Swan district.  He was a strong supporter of responsible government, and left the Council in October 1890 after responsible government had been established.  In 1897 he was elected to the Western Australian Legislative Assembly seat of South Murchison, sitting as a supporter of Sir John Forrest's government.  In 1898, he was appointed president of the royal commission on mining.  The seat of South Murchison was abolished in 1901, and Rason won the Legislative Assembly seat of Guildford in the general elections of April 1901.  When George Leake formed his second government in December 1901, Rason was appointed minister for works, holding responsibility for administration of the Coolgardie Water Scheme. Under Walter James' premiership from July 1902 until August 1904, he was minister for works and railways, and was also treasurer for a few months from April 1904.  After Labor took office in August 1904, he became Leader of the Opposition.

Rason became Premier, Treasurer and Minister for Justice on 25 August 1905, after Henry Daglish's Labor government was defeated.  Like Daglish, Rason did not have a majority of support, but he was granted an early dissolution in October, and easily won the subsequent general election.  Later that year he headed the royal commission on immigration.

Later life
Rason did not provide firm leadership as premier, and was dogged by family and financial worries.  In May 1906 he appointed himself as Agent General for Western Australia in London before resigning as premier to take up the post, an action which drew strong criticism.  He held the post until 1911, after which he pursued a business career in Britain.  He was made Knight Bachelor in 1909.  He died at Beckenham, Kent, in England on 15 March 1927.

References

1858 births
1927 deaths
Agents-General for Western Australia
Mayors of places in Western Australia
Settlers of Western Australia
English emigrants to Australia
Members of the Western Australian Legislative Assembly
Members of the Western Australian Legislative Council
People from North Somerset (district)
Premiers of Western Australia
Australian Knights Bachelor
Treasurers of Western Australia
Australian auctioneers